Sora Sompeng is a Unicode block containing characters for writing the Sora language of India.

History
The following Unicode-related documents record the purpose and process of defining specific characters in the Sora Sompeng block:

References 

Unicode blocks